de Bertier de Sauvigny is an aristocratic French surname. People with that surname include:

Ferdinand de Bertier de Sauvigny (1782–1864), French politician.
Guillaume de Bertier de Sauvigny (1912–2004), French historian. 
Jean de Bertier de Sauvigny (1877–1926), French politician.

Surnames of French origin